Ala Moana Center station is a planned Honolulu Rail Transit station in Honolulu, Hawaii. It is part of the fourth HART segment, scheduled to open in 2031. It will be located nearby the Ala Moana Center.

The Hawaiian Station Name Working Group proposed Hawaiian names for the twelve rail stations on the eastern end of the rail system (stations in the Airport and City Center segments) in April 2019. The proposed name for this station, Kālia, means "waited for" and refers to an ʻili near the Waikīkī coast used for salt production and fishponds.

References

Honolulu Rail Transit stations
Railway stations scheduled to open in 2031